Live at Shepperton '74 is a live album by British rock band Uriah Heep, released in 1986. It was recorded live in studio in 1974 for radio broadcasting.

Track listing

Original version 
Side A
 "Easy Livin'" (Hensley) – 2:57
 "So Tired" (Box, Byron, Hensley, Kerslake, Thain) – 3:58
 "I Won't Mind" (Box, Byron, Hensley, Kerslake, Thain) – 5:41
 "Something or Nothing" (Box, Hensley, Thain) – 2:51

Side B
 "Stealin'" (Hensley) – 4:42
 "Love Machine" (Hensley, Byron, Box) – 2:16
 "The Easy Road" (Hensley) – 2:43
 "Rock 'n' Roll Medley" – 5:52

1997 version 
 "Easy Livin'" (Hensley) – 2:57
 "So Tired" (Box, Byron, Hensley, Kerslake, Thain) – 3:58
 "I Won't Mind" (Box, Byron, Hensley, Kerslake, Thain) – 5:41
 "Sweet Freedom" (Hensley) – 6:59
 "Something Or Nothing" (Box, Hensley, Thain) – 3:21
 "The Easy Road" (Hensley) – 2:43
 "Stealin'" (Hensley) – 4:42
 "Love Machine" (Hensley, Byron, Box) – 2:16
 "Rock 'n' Roll Medley" – 7:46
 "Out-Takes (a. The Easy Road, b. Sleazy Livin', c. Easy Livin')" – 5:28
 "Stealin'" (Hensley) – 6:19

Personnel
Uriah Heep
 David Byron – vocals
 Mick Box – guitar, backing vocals
 Ken Hensley – keyboards, guitar, backing vocals
 Lee Kerslake – drums, backing vocals
 Gary Thain – bass guitar, backing vocals

References

 Live at Shepperton '74 at Heepfiles

1986 live albums
Uriah Heep (band) live albums